Andrew Richardson Hill (October 12, 1962 – October 31, 2016) was an American politician, businessman, and engineer. A Republican, he represented District 45 since 2011 in the Washington State Senate, defeating incumbent Democrat Eric Oemig 51%-49% in 2010.

In 2014, he was re-elected, defeating challenger Matt Isenhower by 53%-47%. He was a graduate of Colgate University where he played soccer for four years. After graduating Colgate University, Hill went on to earn an MBA from Harvard Business School in 1990. Before seeking public office, he served as president of the Emily Dickinson Elementary School PTA, and as president of the Lake Washington Youth Soccer Association.

After a recurrence of lung cancer in June 2016, Hill died on October 31, 2016, survived by his wife, Molly, and their three children.

In 2018, Washington State Senate Bill 5375 renamed the cancer research endowment in his name

References

External links

Economic Revenue and Forecast Council (archived)

1962 births
2016 deaths
Republican Party Washington (state) state senators
Colgate University alumni
Colgate Raiders men's soccer players
Harvard Business School alumni
People from Redmond, Washington
Politicians from Denver
Place of death missing
Deaths from lung cancer
Association footballers not categorized by position
Association football players not categorized by nationality